Wooyung is a small town located in the Northern Rivers Region of New South Wales. The most recent census indicated a population of 118, with a median age of 54. Wooyung means 'slow' in the local Bundjalung language, and is believed to reflect the natural tranquility of the area.

History
The owners of the Wooyung area were the Bundjalung people, who built a Bora ring from the wetlands to perform traditional ceremonies and partake in the bounty of nature. The name is an Aboriginal expression, which literally means slow.

In the 19th century, European settlers arrived at Wooyung.

On 6 May 1849, the Swift, en route from Brisbane to Sydney was encountered by a fierce cyclone, which forced the schooner to capsize and cast ashore near Wooyung. Two timber-getting pioneers, John Boyd and Steve King, released the ship's skipper Captain Robb and a passenger who were trapped inside an air pocket. To this day, Captain Robb's descendants still live in the town.

In 1919, a little wooden school was built on the site of a red-brick building which still stands.

In 1935, prospectors looked for gold on Wooyung Beach. Its traces of black mineral sands, rutile and zircon can still be seen in the crumbly black rocks.

Today, Wooyung is a small residential area and lies within part of its nature reserve. Since then, it has not lost its attraction as a range to visitors, including surfers, birdwatchers and fishermen.

Wooyung Nature Reserve
In March 1999, the Wooyung Nature Reserve was established, a protected area of 87 hectares, in the north of the Wooyung locality. The Reserve contains littoral rainforest and borders on the beach.

Development controversy 
In 2006, Tweed Shire Council administrator Lucy Turnbull approved a plan for a controversial $240 million resort at Wooyung, despite there being alleged legal, cultural, environmental and community concerns with the proposed development. As of 2019, funding for the project had still yet to be settled.

Current usage 
Wooyung is currently home to the Wooyung Beach Holiday Park, described in the official NSW Tourist website as "one of the few remaining bush camping sites on the east coast".

Tourism
Wooyung lies along a stretch of uncrowded beaches that lack in beach patrol.

References 

Towns in New South Wales
Northern Rivers